The following highways are numbered 52:

Australia
 Kings Highway (Australia)
 Isis Highway (Childers to Ban Ban Springs) - Queensland State Route 52 (Wide Bay–Burnett Region)
 Gillies Highway - Queensland State Route 52 (Far North Queensland Region)

Canada
  Alberta Highway 52
  British Columbia Highway 52
  Manitoba Highway 52
  Highway 52 (Ontario)
  Saskatchewan Highway 52

Czech Republic
 part of  D52 Motorway
 I/52 Highway; Czech: Silnice I/52

Finland
 Finnish national road 52

India
 National Highway 52 (India)

Italy
 Autostrada A52

Japan
  Japan National Route 52

Korea, South
 Gwangju–Wonju Expressway
National Route 52

New Zealand
 New Zealand State Highway 52 between Waipukurau and Masterton (former)

Philippines
 N52 highway (Philippines)

Turkey
  , a motorway in Turkey running from Adana to Şanlıurfa.

United Kingdom
  British A52 (Newcastle-Mablethorpe)

United States
  U.S. Route 52
  Alabama State Route 52
  Arkansas Highway 52
  California State Route 52
  Colorado State Highway 52
  Connecticut Route 52 (former)
  Delaware Route 52
  Florida State Road 52
  County Road 52 Alternate (Pasco County, Florida)
  Georgia State Route 52
  Georgia State Route 52 (former)
  Idaho State Highway 52
  Illinois Route 52 (former)
  K-52 (Kansas highway)
  Kentucky Route 52
  Louisiana Highway 52
  Louisiana State Route 52 (former)
  Maine State Route 52
  Maryland Route 52 (former)
  Massachusetts Route 52 (former)
  M-52 (Michigan highway)
  Missouri Route 52
  Nebraska Highway 52
  Nevada State Route 52 (former)
  New Jersey Route 52
 County Route 52 (Monmouth County, New Jersey)
  New Mexico State Road 52
  New York State Route 52
  County Route 52 (Albany County, New York)
  County Route 52 (Chautauqua County, New York)
  County Route 52 (Dutchess County, New York)
  County Route 52 (Franklin County, New York)
  County Route 52 (Jefferson County, New York)
  County Route 52 (Madison County, New York)
  County Route 52 (Monroe County, New York)
  County Route 52 (Montgomery County, New York)
  County Route 52 (Niagara County, New York)
  County Route 52 (Orleans County, New York)
  County Route 52 (Otsego County, New York)
  County Route 52 (Rensselaer County, New York)
  County Route 52 (Rockland County, New York)
  County Route 52 (Saratoga County, New York)
  County Route 52 (St. Lawrence County, New York)
  County Route 52 (Steuben County, New York)
  County Route 52 (Suffolk County, New York)
  County Route 52 (Sullivan County, New York)
  County Route 52 (Ulster County, New York)
  County Route 52 (Westchester County, New York)
  Ohio State Route 52 (former)
  Oklahoma State Highway 52
  Oregon Route 52
  Pennsylvania Route 52
  South Carolina Highway 52 (former)
  South Dakota Highway 52
  Tennessee State Route 52
  Texas State Highway 52 (former)
  Texas State Highway Spur 52
  Farm to Market Road 52
  Texas Park Road 52
  Utah State Route 52
  Virginia State Route 52 (former)
  Virginia State Route 52 (1928-1933) (former)
  Virginia State Route 52 (1933-1934) (former)
  West Virginia Route 52
  Wisconsin Highway 52

Territories
  Puerto Rico Highway 52

See also
 List of highways numbered 52A
 A52 (disambiguation)